The 1950 Lehigh Engineers football team was an American football team that represented Lehigh University during the 1950 college football season.  In its fifth season under head coach William Leckonby, the team compiled a 9–0 record (their first undefeated record in the football program's history) and won the Middle Three Conference championship. The Engineers outscored their opponents 301 to 77.

The team played its home games at Taylor Stadium in Bethlehem, Pennsylvania.

Schedule

References

Lehigh
Lehigh Mountain Hawks football seasons
College football undefeated seasons
Lehigh football